Stars Over Broadway is a 1935 American musical film directed by William Keighley, written by Jerry Wald, Julius J. Epstein, & Pat C. Flick, and starring Pat O'Brien, Jane Froman, James Melton, Jean Muir, Frank McHugh, and Eddie Conrad. It was released by Warner Bros. on November 23, 1935.

Plot
 
Al McGillevray, a failed theatrical manager, is about to commit suicide when he hears Jan King, the hotel porter, singing and offers to make him an opera star. After Jan agrees, Al takes a series of odd jobs to pay for his singing lessons, and his teacher, Minotti, arranges an audition at the Metropolitan Opera. Jan is well received, but when Al learns that he will need another five years of study before he will be ready to go on stage, he takes Jan to the radio stations, intending to make him a crooner instead.

At an amateur-hour competition they meet Nora Wyman, another singer. She begs Al to manage her as well, but he tries to discourage her, saying she is too nice for a career in show business.

Jan auditions at a noisy club where he becomes an immediate success and meets another successful singer, Joan Garrett, who helps him get more work.

Al wants Jan to study opera again now that they have enough money, but Jan is having too much fun as a crooner. As he becomes more popular, Jan starts to drink and is late for his shows, then misses one completely and is fired. Al finally succumbs to Nora's wishes and allows Minotti to hear her sing.

Although Minotti thinks Nora has a good voice, Al persuades him to tell her otherwise. Nora is devastated by the news and walks in front of a car. In the hospital, Al tells Nora what he has done, confessing that he lied because he loves her. After he leaves her, he spends the last of his money to send Minotti and Jan to Italy to save Jan's voice. Sometime later, Al visits Jan backstage at his opera debut and Nora is there, too. Jan has learned about Al's generosity and wants him to manage him again. Nora tells Al that she has decided her singing is not important, and all she wants is to be his wife.

New stars and old
Singing star James Melton had enjoyed popularity as part of The Revelers, a close-harmony vocal group of the late 1920s. He went solo as a radio and recording artist in 1934, but had not yet been featured in full-length films. Warner Bros. signed him and groomed him for stardom in Stars Over Broadway. This was also Jane Froman's tryout for features; she had appeared in a single Warner short two years earlier. Meanwhile, Warners' singing star of 1929-30, Frank Fay, had fallen from popularity and made his last appearance for the studio in this film, as the emcee of a radio amateur hour.

Cast 
 Pat O'Brien as Al McGillevray
 Jane Froman as Joan Garrett
 James Melton as Jan King
 Jean Muir as Nora Wyman
 Frank McHugh as Offkey Cramer
 Eddie Conrad as Freddy
 William Ricciardi as Minotti
 Marie Wilson as Molly
 Frank Fay as Announcer
 E. E. Clive as Crane
 George Chandler as Charlie

Reception
Frank S. Nugent of The New York Times wrote in his review: "The Warners have tackled the operatic film with an engaging sense of humor. In Stars Over Broadway, which opened last night at the Strand, they contemplate grand opera with their tongue in their collective cheek, and with Al Dubin and Harry Warren standing by to assist the Messrs. Verdi, Schubert, and von Flotow in moments of upper registral stress and strain. The result is a generally amiable and melodious comedy which merits praise chiefly for its failure of fawn completely upon the diamond horseshoe. If there has been an evil in this operatic film cycle, it has been that of obsequiousness. No Uriah Heep could be more unctuous than the cinema has been in the presence of the Metropolitan. And opera, when placed in the Fellowship of the Sacred Cows, can be made very dull indeed. Just as dull, in fact, as some of the screen plays about those other Sacred Cows—motherhood, the home, the Hippocratic oath and the football team. Stars Over Broadway, then, is close to its best in that moment when Pat O'Brien refuses to permit the opera to claim his protégé. James Melton, and drags him from the Met stage to the microphone to convert his vocal assets into coffee-hour gold. It seemed that the maestri who heard the singer were thrilled with his voice, but felt he needed about five more years of study before chancing a début. And Mr. O'Brien, as he tactfully expressed it, 'needed some dough' and 'wasn't going to wait till I decorate a wheel chair'."

References

External links 
 
 
 
 

1935 films
1930s English-language films
Warner Bros. films
American musical films
1935 musical films
Films directed by William Keighley
Films scored by Heinz Roemheld
American black-and-white films
1930s American films